Apedale is a village in Staffordshire, England. The population at the 2011 census can be found under the Holditch (Ward) of Newcastle-under-Lyme.

The village is home to the  Apedale Community Country Park. The park is unusual for the area as it was previously an opencast mine.

The area has a long history of mining, with the nearby former collieries at Silverdale and Holditch also having been redeveloped for other uses.

See also
Listed buildings in Newcastle-under-Lyme

References 

Villages in Staffordshire